Nicolai Wilhelm Marstrand (24 December 1810 – 25 March 1873), painter and illustrator, was born in Copenhagen, Denmark, to Nicolai Jacob Marstrand, instrument maker and inventor, and Petra Othilia Smith. Marstrand is one of the most renowned artists belonging to the Golden Age of Danish Painting.

Early development and academy training 
Marstrand studied at Copenhagen's Metropolitan School (Metropolitanskolen), but had little interest in books, and left around 16 years of age. Christoffer Wilhelm Eckersberg, painter and professor at the Royal Danish Academy of Art (Det Kongelige Danske Kunstakademi) in Copenhagen, was a close friend of Wilhelm's father, and it was to all appearance Eckersberg who recommended an artistic career for young Wilhelm. Wilhelm had already shown artistic talent, tackling difficult subjects such as group scenes with many figures and complicated composition.

At 16 years of age Marstrand thus began his studies at the Academy under Eckersberg, attending the school from 1826 to 1833.  Although his interests had a firm hold in genre themes – depiction of the daily life he observed around him in Copenhagen's streets, especially middle class society – he would soon reach for the pinnacle of Academic acceptability: the history painting.

History painting displayed what was grand – classical themes from mythology and history, rather than daily life. The traditions, and the taste of traditional art critics, strongly favored it. It was therefore something to strive for, in spite of Marstrand's equal skill at depicting more modest themes, and of the enjoyment he had in portraying the crowds, the diversions of the city, and the humor and story behind the hustle and bustle. Marstrand's creative production would, through many paintings and illustrations made not only during the 1830s but throughout his life, never abandon this inclination toward displaying the simple life of his times.

At the same time Christian Waagepetersen, wine merchant to the Danish court and supporter of the arts, also became an important patron for Marstrand during this early period. His painting "A musical evening party" (Et musikalsk aftenselskab) (1834), depicts such an occasion at the home of Waagepetersen, and was an important transition painting for Marstrand.

Despite an unmistakably growing recognition, Marstrand never received the Academy's gold medal. This medal was coveted not only for its great prestige, but also because it came with a travel stipend for furthering the laureate's artistic training. Marstrand's attempts at winning the medal were unsuccessful both in 1833 with his neoclassical "Flight to Egypt" (Flugten til Ægypten) and in 1835 with "Odysseus and Nausikaa". This was a disappointment, as he had won both available silver medals in 1833.

Foreign travel 

Gold medal or not however, the Academy did award Marstrand a travel stipend. In August 1836 he began the first of his many travels, going by way of Germany to Rome in Italy, stopping on the way at Berlin, Dresden, Nuremberg and Munich. In Italy, where he stayed for four years, he painted many idealized depictions of daily life, especially festivities. He returned to Italy several times, the last visit being in 1869, and when in Rome he spent summer months each year in the hill towns Olevano Romano, Civitella and Subiaco. He was enchanted with Italy and with the ways of life of the Italian people. He portrayed a colorful, joyous, and romantic view of them, infused with a newfound ideal of beauty.

He also painted a number of portraits during this first stay in Italy. Among these are portraits of other travelling Danish artists, such as Christen Købke and travelling partner Johan Adolph Kittendorff. He completed sketches for a large portrait of botanist and politician, J. F. Schouw, which would be later realized as a painting.

Career development 

Marstrand returned to Denmark at the end of 1841, stopping in Munich and Paris on the way. In Denmark he strove to bring back that which he learned in Italy, and allow it to develop in his home culture.

He became a member of the art Academy on 19 June 1843, after submitting the painting "Erasmus Montanus" as his admissions piece. He became a professor at the Academy in 1848. He endeavored to let his students evolve according to their own skills and interests. Among these were the two most renowned Skagen painters Peder Severin Krøyer and Michael Ancher, as well as Carl Bloch and Kristian Zahrtmann.

Marstrand continued to travel regularly around Europe throughout his life, to (London, Vienna, Belgium, but especially to Italy and Rome), at times in the company of such fellow artists such as P. C. Skovgaard and Johan Adolph Kittendorff, or of art historian and critic Niels Lauritz Høyen.

Marstrand also continued to apply inspiration from Italy in his paintings. He now supplied it with themes from literature and the theatre, portraying scenes from Don Quixote by Cervantes, as well as from Erasmus Montanus, or other plays by Ludvig Holberg. Holberg's works would in fact provide Marstrand with an endless stream of inspiration. He also continued to paint genre paintings, and to make sketches, caricatures, and drawings, capturing the spirit of his time with gentle or more biting satire.

On 8 June 1850, Marstrand married Margrethe Christine Weidemann, with whom he was to have five children. His family became yet a new source for his art. There are similarities in his portraits with children to those made by Constantin Hansen, a contemporary, friend, and also student of Eckersberg.

Marstrand returned to portrait painting with even more seriousness in the late 1850s, depicting some of the key figures of the age, including Constantin Hansen (1852, 1862), Bernhard Severin Ingemann (1860), Grundtvig (1863), Høyen (1869), the architect Michael Gottlieb Bindesbøll, not forgetting his earlier portraiture of Købke in 1839.

During the 1850s and 1860s, and especially after the death of his wife in 1867, he finally turned to religious themes. He also gave renewed attention to mythology and history. He painted two remarkable great murals for King Christian IV's chapel in Roskilde Cathedral in 1864-1866, both of which have contributed to this popular monarch's enduring fame. He painted an important altarpiece at Faaborg Church. In 1871, not long before his death, he delivered several massive wallpaintings commissioned for the University of Copenhagen's Celebration Hall. This historical, religious, & monumental development added yet an essential dimension to the already broad scope of Marstrand's work.

At the same time, during the last ten years of his life, part of his work became very intimate. A series of paintings made during the last 6 years of his life featured a naked woman, while others were deeply religious, more inwardly so than the monumental work.

Marstrand was named Director (Chancellor) of the art Academy during two periods: the first period from 1853–1857, the second from 1863 until his death. In 1867 he was awarded the rank of State Councillor (etatsråd).

In October 1871 Marstrand was struck with a brain hemorrhage and partially paralysed, losing much of his work capacity before his death in 1873.

Posthumous reception 
To his contemporaries and a further few generations, Marstrand ranked among Denmark's great painters of all time, to some authorities perhaps as the very greatest. Certainly, he was vastly productive and mastered a remarkable variety of genres – his disinterest for landscape art being a notable exception. More relevant today is the rather striking number of his works which are now familiar signposts of Danish history and culture: scenes from drawing-rooms and streets of Copenhagen during his younger days; the festivity and public life captured in Rome; the many representative portraits of citizens and innovators; even the monumentalist commissions for university and monarchy. Still, as the 20th century progressed, his work had become less valued artistically and downright unfashionable; conversely, recent decades seem to have afforded new appreciation.

See also 

 List of Danish painters
 Troels Marstrand (1815–1889)
 Jacob Marstrand (1848–1935)

References

External links 
 
 KID Art Index (Kunstindex Danmark)
 Danish Biographical Encyclopedia (Dansk biografisk Leksikon) at Project Runeberg.
  Madsen, Karl. Wilhelm Marstrand. Copenhagen, DK: Kunstforeningen, 1905.  
  Marstrand, Otto. Maleren Wilhelm Marstrand. Copenhagen, DK: Thaning & Appel, 2003. .
 Nørregård-Nielsen, Hans Edvard. The Golden Age of Danish Art: Drawings from the Royal Museum of Fine Arts, Copenhagen. Alexandria, VA: Art Services International, 1995. .
  Valentiner, Gitte. Wilhelm Marstrand: Scenebilleder. Copenhagen, DK: Gyldendal, 1992. .
 Source
 Source

1810 births
1873 deaths
19th-century Danish illustrators
Artists from Copenhagen
19th-century Danish painters
Danish male painters
Danish portrait painters
Directors of the Royal Danish Academy of Fine Arts
Royal Danish Academy of Fine Arts alumni
Knights of the Order of the Dannebrog
19th-century painters of historical subjects
Danish war artists
19th-century war artists
Recipients of the Thorvaldsen Medal
Vilhelm
19th-century Danish male artists